The Hôtel de Caumont is a listed hôtel particulier in Aix-en-Provence in France.

Location
It is located at 1 rue Joseph Cabassol, in the Quartier Mazarin of Aix-en-Provence.

History
It was designed by architects Robert de Cotte (1656–1735) and Georges Vallon (1688-1767), and built from 1715 to 1742 for François Rolland de Réauville de Tertulle, the Marquess of Cabannes. Sculptors Jean-Baptiste Rambot and Bernard Toro designed the atlas. Inside, the entrance has an indoor fountain, with two sets of stairs: one for the family, and another one for the staff.

The hotel was inherited by Jean-Baptiste-François de Tertulle, son of François Rolland de Réauville de Tertulle. Upon his death, his widow sold it to François de Bruny de la Tour d'Aigues (1690-1772). It was inherited by his son, the Marseilles shipowner  (1724-1794), who served as the Président à mortier of the Parliament of Aix-en-Provence. He bequeathed it on to his son Marie Jean Joseph (1768-1800), who again passed it to his sister, Pauline de Bruny de la Tour d'Aigues (1767-1850), who had married Amable-Victor-Joseph-François de Paule de Seytres de Caumont (1764-1841), the Marquess of Caumont, in 1796. He was accused of "stealing the most beautiful hôtel particulier from Provence by this marriage," as a street sign outside the hotel suggests. The marriage was childless, and the hotel was bequeathed to one of Pauline's cousins.

In 1964, General Isembart sold it to the city of Aix. They rented it out to La Poste, the postal service in France. From 1970 to 2013, it was home to a music school, the Conservatoire Darius Milhaud.

It has been listed as a monument historique since 1990.

At present

Hôtel de Caumont was purchased in 2013 by Culturespaces for €10 million. Over the next two years it underwent extensive refurbishing, and reopened to the public on May 6, 2015, as a paid attraction and cultural space, exhibiting sections of the house and garden as they were in their prime, along with a gift shop, art exhibition space, and a small theater.

Gallery

References

Hôtels particuliers in Aix-en-Provence
Monuments historiques of Aix-en-Provence
Houses completed in 1742
Engie
1742 establishments in France